John Henry Frost (30 January 1847 – 1 November 1916) was an English first-class cricketer who played for Derbyshire in 1874.

Frost was born in Wirksworth, the son of George Frost, a farmer/builder, and his wife Mary. He became a joiner and played cricket for Wirksworth - taking part in matches against All England XI in 1868 and 1870

Frost played for Derbyshire in the 1873 season in a miscellaneous match against Nottinghamshire. He made his debut and only first-class appearance during the 1874 season, a victory against Kent. Frost was an upper-order batsman and played alongside his brother George Frost for a 41-run second-wicket partnership. His brother had first played for Derbyshire two years previously and had a much longer career, playing 37 games between 1872 and 1880. Frost played one extra game in 1874 a match against the United South of England. In 1883 and 1884 Frost played several games for Staffordshire.

Frost died in Ashover at the age of 69.

References

1847 births
1916 deaths
English cricketers
Derbyshire cricketers
People from Wirksworth
Cricketers from Derbyshire
Staffordshire cricketers
People from Ashover